Zheng Yu (born 7 February 1996) is a Chinese badminton player from the Jiangsu province team. She started playing badminton in 2003, claimed the Jiangsu province title in the singles and doubles category in 2006 and 2007, then was selected to join the national team for the first time in 2010. She was part of the national junior team that won the mixed team gold medals at the 2011 Asian and 2012 World Junior Championships. She won her first senior international title at the BWF Super 500 tournament 2020 Malaysia Masters partnered with Li Wenmei.

Career 

Starting from 2022, Zheng partnered with Zhang Shuxian and finished as the runners-up at the All England Open, Malaysia Open and Singapore Open, before finally winning the Australian Open. As a result, the pair qualified for the year-end final. They reached the semi-finals before bowing out to compatriots Chen Qingchen and Jia Yifan.

Achievements

BWF World Tour (3 titles, 6 runners-up) 
The BWF World Tour, which was announced on 19 March 2017 and implemented in 2018, is a series of elite badminton tournaments sanctioned by the Badminton World Federation (BWF). The BWF World Tour is divided into levels of World Tour Finals, Super 1000, Super 750, Super 500, Super 300, and the BWF Tour Super 100.

Women's doubles

References

External links 
 

1996 births
Living people
Badminton players from Shandong
Chinese female badminton players
Badminton players at the 2018 Asian Games
Asian Games silver medalists for China
Asian Games medalists in badminton
Medalists at the 2018 Asian Games